Brandi Chavonne Massey is an American stage actress and singer.

She graduated from The School for Creative and Performing Arts in Cincinnati, Ohio. She made her Broadway debut in the 1997 production of Jekyll and Hyde.  Since then, Massey has starred in the Broadway productions of Caroline, or Change (as "The Radio") and Wicked (as an ensemble member, understudying the role of Elphaba). She also worked in The Lion King'''s London production as the lioness Nala from 2002 to 2003. Her Off-Broadway credits include: Ghetto Superstar, Carmen Jones, and Caroline, or Change as well as the Encores! production of Hair.  Massey left Wicked'' on December 17, 2006, to concentrate on recording an album. Massey is currently touring around North America with the National tour of Oprah Winfrey's "The Color Purple" understudying the characters of Celie and Nettie.
Brandi starred as "Mary Magdeline" in Jesus Christ Superstar at North Carolina Theatre in Raleigh, NC from February 24 – March 4, 2007.
Brandi starred at Lorell in the Atlanta production of Dreamgirls at The Fox Theater from July 18–29, 2007 alongside Original Broadway Cast member Jennifer Holliday.

References

External links
 Brandi Chavonne Massey Online – The Official Fansite

Living people
1979 births
African-American actresses
20th-century African-American women singers
American musical theatre actresses
21st-century African-American people
21st-century African-American women